is a stable of sumo wrestlers, part of the Nishonoseki ichimon or group of stables. It was founded in 1961 by former sekiwake Tamanoumi Daitarō, who branched off from Nishonoseki stable. Former sekiwake Tamanofuji took over the running of the stable upon Tamanoumi's death in 1987. In February 2010 he passed control over to another former sekiwake, Tamakasuga, remaining in the stable under the elder name Tateyama.  it had four active wrestlers. The March 2023 tournament saw the first promotion to the jūryō division for the stable since the former Tamakasuga took over as head coach, with Tamashōhō becoming its first new sekitori since Tamawashi in January 2008.

History

Ring name conventions
Almost all wrestlers at this stable for the last forty years take the ring names or shikona that begin with the character 玉 (read: tama), meaning ball or sphere, in deference to the line of owners who have used this character in their own shikona.

Owners
2010–present: 14th Kataonami Ryōji (iin, former sekiwake Tamakasuga)
1987-2010: 13th Kataonami Daizō (former sekiwake Tamanofuji)
1961-1987: 12th Kataonami Taketarō (former sekiwake Tamanoumi)

Notable active wrestlers

Tamawashi (best rank sekiwake)
 (best rank jūryō)

Coaches
Tateyama Daizō (san'yo: senior councilor, former sekiwake Tamanofuji)
Kumagatani Daisuke (former maegashira Tamaasuka)

Notable former members
Tamanoumi (the 51st yokozuna)
Tamakasuga (former sekiwake)
Tamanofuji (former sekiwake)
Tamanoshima (former sekiwake)
Tamakiyama (former komusubi)
Tamaryū (former komusubi)
Tamaarashi (former maegashira)
Tamakairiki (former maegashira)
Tamarikidō (former maegashira)
Tamaasuka (former maegashira)

Usher
Kōhei (makushita yobidashi, real name Oyama Kōhei)

Hairdresser
Tokoshin (third class tokoyama)

Location and access
Tokyo, Sumida Ward, Ishihara 1-33-9
15 minute walk from Ryōgoku Station on Sōbu Line

See also
List of sumo stables
List of active sumo wrestlers
List of past sumo wrestlers
Glossary of sumo terms

References

External links 
Official site 
Japan Sumo Association profile

Active sumo stables